Symm or Symms is a surname. Notable people with the surname include:

Colin Symm (born 1946), English footballer
Robert Symms (1931–2014), American photographer
Steve Symms (born 1938), American politician and lobbyist
Vallan Symms (born 1980), Belizean footballer

See also
Symm v. United States